Damien Nazon (born 26 June 1974) is a former French racing cyclist. He finished in last place in the 1998 Tour de France. Nazon took a total of 33 victories during his career, including stage wins in the Dauphiné Libéré, the Grand Prix du Midi Libre, the Critérium International and the Tour of Belgium.

He is the brother of former racing cyclist Jean-Patrick Nazon.

Major results

1994
1st Stage 1 Circuit Cycliste Sarthe
1995
Peace Race
1st Stages 6 & 8b
1st Paris–Roubaix Espoirs
10th Overall Tour de l'Avenir
1997
Circuit des Mines
1st Stages 4 & 6
1st Stage 6 Tour de l'Avenir
2nd Road race, National Road Championships
10th GP de Denain
1998
1st Stage 2 Critérium du Dauphiné Libéré
1st Stage 4 GP du Midi-Libre
3rd Overall Circuit des Mines
1st Stages 1 & 2
4th Tour de Vendée
1999
Circuit Cycliste Sarthe
1st Stages 3 & 5
Tour de Normandie
1st Stages 2 & 6b
1st Stage 5 Tour de l'Avenir
6th GP de Denain
10th Tour de Vendée
2000
1st Stage 3 Tour de Langkawi
1st Stage 1 GP du Midi-Libre
1st Stage 1 Tour du Poitou Charentes et de la Vienne
1st GP de Villers-Cotterêts
4th Cholet-Pays de Loire
7th Road race, National Road Championships
8th Tro-Bro Léon
9th GP de la Ville de Rennes
2001
2nd Overall Étoile de Bessèges
1st Stages 3 & 4
5th GP de Denain
6th Tour de Vendée
2002
1st Stage 1 Tour de l'Ain
1st Stage 1 Route du Sud
1st Stage 2a Tour of Belgium
1st Stage 3 Tour du Poitou Charentes et de la Vienne
2nd Overall Tour of Qatar
1st Stage 2
3rd GP de Denain
6th Grand Prix de la Ville de Lillers Souvenir Bruno Comini
9th Road race, National Road Championships
2003
1st Grand Prix de la Ville de Lillers Souvenir Bruno Comini
1st Stage 1 Critérium International
5th Overall Tour of Qatar
1st Stage 2
5th Classic Haribo
6th Cholet-Pays de Loire
7th Dwars door Vlaanderen
10th Le Samyn
2005
1st Stage 3 Circuit Cycliste Sarthe
1st Stage 3b Tour de Picardie
4th Cholet-Pays de Loire

References

External links

1974 births
Living people
French male cyclists
Sportspeople from Épinal
Cyclists from Grand Est